Midnight Theatre is ROMEO's first full Japanese length studio album. Released on December 19, 2012 and consists of 14 tracks, including previously released songs from Give Me Your Heart and Tonight's the Night.

Track listing

Release history

References

External links
 
 

SS501 albums
2012 albums
Victor Entertainment albums